Hebron Church, also known as Hebron Methodist Church, is a historic Methodist church located at Bucksville in Horry County, South Carolina. The sanctuary was built about 1855 and is a rectangular "meeting house form" one-story frame church with batten siding and a gable roof covered with tin.  It features a slightly lower, pedimented, projecting portico supported by five square, wooden columns. Also on the property are two graveyards: the church graveyard and the Henry Buck family graveyard located across the road.

It was listed on the National Register of Historic Places in 1977.

Gallery

References

External links
 
 

Churches on the National Register of Historic Places in South Carolina
Cemeteries on the National Register of Historic Places in South Carolina
Churches completed in 1855
19th-century Methodist church buildings in the United States
Methodist churches in South Carolina
Churches in Horry County, South Carolina
National Register of Historic Places in Horry County, South Carolina